The 2017 Supersport World Championship season was the twenty-first season of the Supersport World Championship, the nineteenth held under this name. The season was contested over 12 races at 12 locations, starting from 26 February at Phillip Island Grand Prix Circuit in Australia to 4 November at Losail International Circuit in Qatar.

Race calendar and results

Entry list

All entries used Pirelli tyres.

Championship standings

Riders' championship

Bold – Pole positionItalics – Fastest lap

Manufacturers' championship

References

External links

Supersport World Championship seasons
World